Sukorady is a municipality and village in Jičín District in the Hradec Králové Region of the Czech Republic. It has about 200 inhabitants.

Administrative parts
The village of Kouty is an administrative part of Sukorady.

Notable people
Věra Ferbasová (1913–1976), actress

References

Villages in Jičín District